The men's team sabre was one of eight fencing events on the fencing at the 1992 Summer Olympics programme. It was the nineteenth appearance of the event. The competition was held from August 6 to 7, 1992. 59 fencers from 12 nations competed.

Rosters

Canada
 Jean-Paul Banos
 Jean-Marie Banos
 Tony Plourde
 Evens Gravel
 Leszek Nowosielski

China
 Jia Guihua
 Ning Xiankui
 Yang Zhen
 Jiang Yefei
 Zheng Zhaokang

France
 Jean-François Lamour
 Jean-Philippe Daurelle
 Franck Ducheix
 Hervé Granger-Veyron
 Pierre Guichot

Germany
 Felix Becker
 Jörg Kempenich
 Jürgen Nolte
 Jacek Huchwajda
 Steffen Wiesinger

Great Britain
 Kirk Zavieh
 Ian Williams
 Gary Fletcher
 James Williams
 Amin Zahir

Hungary
 Bence Szabó
 Csaba Köves
 György Nébald
 Péter Abay
 Imre Bujdosó

Italy
 Marco Marin
 Ferdinando Meglio
 Giovanni Scalzo
 Giovanni Sirovich
 Tonhi Terenzi

Poland
 Marek Gniewkowski
 Norbert Jaskot
 Jarosław Kisiel
 Robert Kościelniakowski
 Janusz Olech

Romania
 Alexandru Chiculiţă
 Victor Găureanu
 Daniel Grigore
 Florin Lupeică
 Vilmoș Szabo

Spain
 Antonio García
 Raúl Peinador
 José Luis Álvarez
 Marco Antonio Rioja
 Alberto Falcón

Unified Team
 Grigory Kiriyenko
 Aleksandr Shirshov
 Heorhiy Pohosov
 Vadym Huttsait
 Stanislav Pozdnyakov

United States
 Mike Lofton
 Bob Cottingham
 Steve Mormando
 John Friedberg
 Peter Westbrook

Results

Round 1

Round 1 Pool A

Round 1 Pool B

Round 1 Pool C

Round 1 Pool D

Elimination rounds

References

Fencing at the 1992 Summer Olympics
Men's events at the 1992 Summer Olympics